Belušino is a village in the municipality of Kruševo, North Macedonia.

Demographics
According to the 2002 census, the village had a total of 64 inhabitants. Ethnic groups in the village include:

Albanians 91
Others 1

References

External links

Villages in Kruševo Municipality
Albanian communities in North Macedonia